Saint Coorilos Paulose of Panampady (Coorilos of Malankara), also known as Kochuparambil Thirumeni, or Panampady Thirumeni, was Malankara Metropolitan of the Malankara Syrian Orthodox Church in India from 1911 to 1917.

Life 
Coorilos was born December 4, 1850, in Kandanad, Kerala, India, to Varkey and Anna Paulose.

He was ordained as a deacon by Koorilos Yuyakim, the Reesh Episcopo of Malankara, at the age of nine, and studied under Pallathattu Geevarghese Kassisso, Stephanos and Koonappillil Geevarghese Kassisso.

He was ordained as a priest by Mathews Athanasius, Malankara Metropolitan, and celebrated his first Eucharist at the Kandanad Church. He was re-ordained by Dionysious V, Malankara Metropolitan, due to a church dispute, and he later served as a vicar at Mulanthuruthy Church. When Coorilos was still a priest, he began a monastic life at Vettikkal Shrine alongside Geevarghese Ramban, after Ignatius Peter IV—Patriarch of Antioch—ordained him as a monk (ramban) and declared Vettikal Shrine as a monastery at the request of Geevarghese Gregorios of Parumala, which made it the first monastery of the Syriac Orthodox Church in Malankara. Coorilos served as manager of the Old Seminary, and took a prominent role in constructing the St. George Church of Trivandrum and St. Thomas Chapel of Manarcad, as well as founding several schools. He also visited the Holy Land with Geevarghese Gregorios during his time as a monk.

He was consecrated as a metropolitan on 31 May 1908 by Ignatius Abded Aloho II—Patriarch of Antioch—together with Geevarghese Dionysius of Vattasseril, at the Monastery of Saint Mark, Jerusalem, according to the decisions of the regional synod of Malankara.

In 1909, Geevarghese Dionysius became Malankara Metropolitan of the Jacobite Syrian Church. However, in 1911 the church split following disputes, and Patriarch Abded excommunicated Geevarghese Dionysius, who became Malankara Metropolitan of the newly-formed Orthodox Syrian Church.

Coorilos was elected as Malankara Metropolitan on 30 August 1911 by the Syrian Christian Association at a meeting held at Aluva under the leadership of Ignatius Abded Aloho II, Patriarch of Antioch.

Coorilos died on 14 December 1917.

Sainthood
Ignatius Zakka I, Patriarch of Antioch, declared him a saint on 24 October 2008 for being a holy father who had preserved the faith in the crisis of the Syriac Orthodox Church in India, and gave permission to remember the name of Coorilos Paulose in the Fifth Diptych.

References

1850 births
1917 deaths
Christian clergy from Kerala
Oriental Orthodoxy in India